Torkild may refer to:

Torkild Brakstad (1945–2021), Norwegian football player and coach
Torkild Garp (1883–1976), Danish gymnast
Torkild Rieber (1882–1968), Norwegian immigrant to America and Chairman of Texaco
Torkild Strandberg (born 1970), Swedish politician